The Provincial Council of Limburg, also called Limburgs Parlement, are the provincial council for the Dutch province of Limburg. It forms the legislative body of the province. Its 47 seats are distributed every four years in provincial elections. Since December 2021, it has been chaired by Emile Roemer (SP).

Current composition
Since the 2019 provincial elections, the distribution of seats of the Provincial Council of Limburg has been as follows:

See also
 Provincial politics in the Netherlands

References

External links
  

Politics of Limburg (Netherlands)
History of Limburg (Netherlands)
Limburg